Live at Gilley's is a live album by singer and songwriter Leon Russell. The album was recorded on September 17, 1981, at Gilley's Club in Pasadena, Texas. The recording was first released on April 25, 2000. The second release was in 2019 by Leon Russell Records with Varèse Sarabande.

Track listing
 "Mystery Train" (Junior Parker, Sam Phillips) – 2:46
 "One More Love Song" (Leon Russell) – 4:23
 "Truck Drivin' Man" (Terry Fell) – 1:51
 "Cajun Love Song" (Eddie Miller, Russell) – 3:05  
 "My Cricket" (Russell) – 2:39
 "I'm Movin' On" (Hank Snow) – 2:13 
 "Lady Blue" (Russell) – 3:23 
 "In the Pines" (Huddie Ledbetter, Alan Riggs, Russell) – 3:29
 "Song for You" (Russell) – 3:54
 "Uncle Pen" (Bill Monroe) – 2:10 
 "Prince of Peace" (Greg Dempsey, Russell) – 4:40 
 "Rollin' in My Sweet Baby's Arms" (Lester Flat) – 2:59

Personnel
Leon Russell – vocals
Elise Brown – Project Manager
Teddy Jack – Engineer, Mixing
Alan Rubens – Producer
Janine Silvers – Production Coordination

References

External links

Leon Russell discography
Leon Russell lyrics
Leon Russell Records
Leon Russell NAMM Oral History Program Interview (2012)

2000 live albums
Leon Russell albums
Albums produced by Leon Russell